Syed Hussain Abbas (born 25 April 1989) is a Pakistani footballer, who plays for WAPDA FC.

He plays as a midfielder and played his first international game for Pakistan in 2011 during the 2014 World Cup qualifiers in a match against Bangladesh.

References

 

Pakistani footballers
Pakistan international footballers
1989 births
Living people
Association football midfielders